Borel is a tiny lunar impact crater located in the southeast part of Mare Serenitatis. It was named after French mathematician Émile Borel. To the northeast is the crater Le Monnier and to the southeast is the crater Abetti. Borel was previously identified as Le Monnier C.

This is a roughly circular, cup-shaped formation with inner floors that slope down to the midpoint of the crater. The interior has a higher albedo than the surrounding dark lunar mare.

References

 
 
 
 
 
 
 
 
 
 
 

Impact craters on the Moon
Mare Serenitatis